The First Battle of Lawdar refers to the Yemeni army offensive, launched between 19 and 25 August 2010 on the city of Lawdar, that at the time was controlled by Al-Qaeda in the Arabian Peninsula. Several activists, including local leaders of Al Qaeda, were killed during the clashes. On 25 August, Yemeni authorities claimed to regain control.

References

Lawdar
Lawdar
2010 in Yemen
Abyan Governorate
Military operations involving Yemen
August 2010 events in Asia